Sweetland may refer to:

Places
 Sweetland, California, United States
 Sweetland, Nova Scotia, Canada

Other uses
 Sweetland (surname)
 Sweet Land, a 2005 American independent film
 Sweetland Farmhouse, a historic farmhouse located at Cazenovia in Madison County, New York, USA